Colin Frederick Campbell, 1st Baron Colgrain (13 June 1866 – 3 November 1954), was a Scottish banker.

He was educated at Eton College.

He was President of the British Bankers' Association from 1938 to 1946 and was also a Director of the National Provincial Bank and of London Assurance. On 28 January 1946 he was raised to the peerage as Baron Colgrain, of Everlands in the County of Kent.

Lord Colgrain married Lady Angela Mary Alice, daughter of Henry Ryder, 4th Earl of Harrowby, in 1890. She died in 1939.
Colgrain died in November 1954, aged 88, and was succeeded in the barony by his eldest son Donald.

References

Notes
Kidd, Charles, Williamson, David (editors). Debrett's Peerage and Baronetage (1990 edition). New York: St Martin's Press, 1990, 

1866 births
1954 deaths
People educated at Eton College
British bankers
Clan Campbell
Barons created by George VI